Kawaha Point is a suburb of Rotorua in the Bay of Plenty Region of New Zealand's North Island.

History 
In 1910 the area was used for growing potatoes. In 1917 a son of businessman and politician, Robert Gillies, Arthur William Gillies (1871-1940), started the development of Kawaha Point, when he offered an area for a hospital, on condition that the government improve the road. A loan to improve the road was approved in 1924. Land was sold in 1927 and more in 1929. Initially development was only on the south side of the point. The area to the north was built between about 1966 and 2000.

Demographics

Kawaha had a population of 1,902 at the 2018 New Zealand census, an increase of 129 people (7.3%) since the 2013 census, and an increase of 261 people (15.9%) since the 2006 census. There were 687 households, comprising 930 males and 975 females, giving a sex ratio of 0.95 males per female. The median age was 39.3 years (compared with 37.4 years nationally), with 411 people (21.6%) aged under 15 years, 333 (17.5%) aged 15 to 29, 846 (44.5%) aged 30 to 64, and 312 (16.4%) aged 65 or older.

Ethnicities were 66.1% European/Pākehā, 33.4% Māori, 7.3% Pacific peoples, 10.6% Asian, and 2.4% other ethnicities. People may identify with more than one ethnicity.

The percentage of people born overseas was 21.8, compared with 27.1% nationally.

Although some people chose not to answer the census's question about religious affiliation, 48.7% had no religion, 36.4% were Christian, 2.5% had Māori religious beliefs, 1.4% were Hindu, 0.5% were Muslim, 1.1% were Buddhist and 2.4% had other religions.

Of those at least 15 years old, 339 (22.7%) people had a bachelor's or higher degree, and 246 (16.5%) people had no formal qualifications. The median income was $31,200, compared with $31,800 nationally. 285 people (19.1%) earned over $70,000 compared to 17.2% nationally. The employment status of those at least 15 was that 741 (49.7%) people were employed full-time, 201 (13.5%) were part-time, and 87 (5.8%) were unemployed.

Education

The school teaches some classes in the Māori language. The school opened in 1979.

Transport 
Kawaha has been served by a bus since at least 1943 and now has a half-hourly service. Ngongotahā cycleway, which was opened in 2012, runs to the west of Kawaha.

References

Suburbs of Rotorua
Populated places in the Bay of Plenty Region
Populated places on Lake Rotorua